Atrebatum can refer to the following places:
Calleva Atrebatum, modern Silchester 
Atrebatum, ancient Roman name of Arras, in northern France